The first combat operations of FASH were operations of the Albanian Air Force and Anti-Aircraft Regiment against Greek fighter pilots and soldiers who violated Albanian airspace during the Greek Civil War in 1949 also known as the August Provocations 1949 Also from an incident that was described as a covert Greek CIA operation

Background 
Towards the end of the Greek Civil War, the Soviet Union who had previously been supporting and supplying the Greek communist rebels, cut all incoming supplies to the rebels in line with the percentages agreement. This move left the Greek communist rebels weakened and after Yugoslavia withdrew support to the rebels in July 1949, their only safe haven to launch attacks against royalist forces lay in Albania.

Operation

First Operation
The first operation of FASH were undertaken by the  Albanian anti-aircraft regiment units and they hit and shot down a Greek Spitfire type plane that had violated Albanian airspace for a spying mission. The Greek plane was destroyed and the pilot was found dead.

Second Operation
In August 1949, the anti-aircraft units of the same Regiment hit and shot down another Greek plane during the August Provocations. The Greek plane, damaged by the Ali Demi anti-aircraft regiment fire, was forced to land in the field where it was captured by Albanian combat units. The Greek pilot was captured and imprisoned as a prisoner of war.

Last Incident
In April 1952, a Spinoage Greek pilot Nikos Akrivojanis of the CIA is captured by Albanian Air Force soldiers. He is said to have landed as he wanted to flee Greece because of the government but he was in Albania for a covert operation. The Albanian soldiers arrested him while he was spying on the Albanian authorities while in captivity, so he was arrested during the trial on December 13, 1953 and on August 16, 1954 he was executed by an Albanian execute commando.

References 

Battles and operations of the Greek Civil War
Battles involving Albania